Lyudmila Ivanovna Bragina (born 24 July 1943) is a retired Soviet and Russian middle distance runner. She competed for the Soviet Union in the 1500 m at the 1972 and 1976 Olympics; she won the event in 1972 and finished fifth in 1976. In July 1972 she set a new 1500 m world record of 4:06.9, at the Soviet championships, and then progressively improved it in round 1 (4:06.47), the semi-finals (4:05.07}, and the final (4:01.38), of the 1972 Olympics. The same year she was awarded the Order of the Red Banner of Labour. She also set three world records in the 3000 m: 8:53.0 in 1972, 8:52.74 in 1974 and 8:27.12 in 1976. At the European Championships, Bragina won four silver medals: in the 3,000 m outdoors (1974), and in the 800 m (1970) and 1,500 m indoors (1971–72).

In 1960 Bragina started training in the high jump, and changed to running only in 1964. She had a career-threatening bout of pneumonia in 1966. After recovering she moved to the south of Russia, in Krasnodar, where she later worked as an athletics coach.

References

External links
 Biography

1943 births
Living people
Sportspeople from Yekaterinburg
Communist Party of the Soviet Union members
Honoured Masters of Sport of the USSR
Recipients of the Order of the Red Banner of Labour
Soviet female middle-distance runners
Russian female middle-distance runners
Dynamo sports society athletes
Olympic athletes of the Soviet Union
Athletes (track and field) at the 1972 Summer Olympics
Athletes (track and field) at the 1976 Summer Olympics
Olympic gold medalists for the Soviet Union
World record setters in athletics (track and field)
European Athletics Championships medalists
Medalists at the 1972 Summer Olympics
Olympic gold medalists in athletics (track and field)